Dabou Department is a department of Grands-Ponts Region in Lagunes District, Ivory Coast. In 2021, its population was 213,582 and its seat is the settlement of Dabou. The sub-prefectures of the department are Dabou, Lopou, and Toupah.

History

Dabou Department was created in 1998 as a second-level subdivision via a split-off from Abidjan Department. At its creation, it was part of Lagunes Region.

In 2005, Dabou Department was divided to create Sikensi Department.

In 2011, districts were introduced as new first-level subdivisions of Ivory Coast. At the same time, regions were reorganised and became second-level subdivisions and all departments were converted into third-level subdivisions. At this time, Dabou Department became part of Grands-Ponts Region in Lagunes District.

Notes

Departments of Grands-Ponts
1998 establishments in Ivory Coast
States and territories established in 1998